Events from the year 1964 in China.

Incumbents 
 Chairman of the Chinese Communist Party – Mao Zedong
 President of the People's Republic of China – Liu Shaoqi
 Premier of the People's Republic of China – Zhou Enlai
 Chairman of the National People's Congress – Zhu De
 Vice President of the People's Republic of China – Soong Ching-ling and Dong Biwu
 Vice Premier of the People's Republic of China – Chen Yun (until December 21), Lin Biao (starting December 21)

Governors 
 Governor of Anhui Province – Huang Yan
 Governor of Fujian Province – Wei Jinshui 
 Governor of Gansu Province – Deng Baoshan
 Governor of Guangdong Province – Chen Yu 
 Governor of Guizhou Province – Zhou Lin (politician)
 Governor of Hebei Province – Liu Zihou 
 Governor of Heilongjiang Province – Li Fanwu
 Governor of Henan Province – Wen Minsheng 
 Governor of Hubei Province – Zhang Tixue 
 Governor of Hunan Province – Cheng Qian 
 Governor of Jiangsu Province – Hui Yuyu 
 Governor of Jiangxi Province – Shao Shiping 
 Governor of Jilin Province – Li Youwen 
 Governor of Liaoning Province – Huang Oudong 
 Governor of Qinghai Province – Wang Zhao
 Governor of Shaanxi Province – Li Qiming 
 Governor of Shandong Province – Bai Rubing 
 Governor of Shanxi Province – Wei Heng 
 Governor of Sichuan Province – Li Dazhang
 Governor of Yunnan Province – Ding Yichuan
 Governor of Zhejiang Province – Zhou Jianren

Events

January
 January 25 – France and China establish diplomatic relations.

October
 October 16 – China explodes an atomic bomb in Sinkiang.

Births 
 April 26 – Zhu Jun, actor and host
 June 23 – Lou Yun, gymnast
 August 3 – Ye Qiaobo, speed skater
 October 30 – Ma Xiangjun, archer
 Jiang Yu, politician
Gao Chengyong, serial killer and rapist (d. 2019)

Deaths

References

See also
Timeline of Chinese history
1964 in Chinese film

 
Years of the 20th century in China
China